Pyotr Stepanovich Deynekin (14 December 1937 – 19 August 2017) was a Russian military general. He was born in Morozovsk, Russian SFSR, Soviet Union. In 1997, he was awarded the Hero of the Russian Federation. Deynekin's rank was General of the army.

In 1969, he graduated from the Gagarin Air Force Academy. 

From 1991 to 1992, he was commander-in-chief of the air force and deputy defense minister of the USSR. In 1992, he served as commander-in-chief of the Air Force of the Commonwealth of Independent States. From 1992 until 1998, he was the commanding officer of the Air Force of the Russian Federation. 

He retired in 2002.

Deynekin died on 19 August 2017 in Moscow at the age of 79.

References

1937 births
2017 deaths
Russian Air Force generals
Soviet Air Force generals
Burials at the Federal Military Memorial Cemetery
Heroes of the Russian Federation
Generals of the army (Russia)
1st class Active State Councillors of the Russian Federation
People from Rostov Oblast